= Niyo Bosco =

Rwandan singer-songwriter

- Birth name: Niyokwizerwa Bosco
- Born: 2000 or 2001 (age 24–25); Kigali, Rwanda
- Genres: R&B; Gospel Music
- Occupations: Artist; songwriter; guitarist
- Years active: 2020–present

Niyokwizerwa Bosco, professionally known as Niyo Bosco, is a Rwandan artist, songwriter and guitarist. He lost his sight at 12 due to malaria. Bosco is known both for his own music and for writing songs for other artists.

== Discography ==
=== Singles and collaborations ===
Singles
Track name	Release date
Ubigenza Ute?	2020
Uzabe Intwari	January 29, 2020
IBANGA	February 20, 2020
Ubumuntu	May 4, 2020
Imbabazi	August 18, 2020
Seka	2021
Izindi Mbaraga by Aline Gahongayire feat. Niyo Bosco	March 5, 2021
Piyapuresha	July 12, 2021
Imbabazi	August 18, 2020
Ishyano	January 2, 2022
